Francisco de Urríes or Francisco de Verreis (died 26 October 1551) was a Roman Catholic prelate who served as Bishop of Urgell (1534–1551) and Bishop of Patti (1518–1534).

Biography
On 21 June 1518, he was appointed by Pope Leo X as Bishop of Patti. On 8 June 1534, he was appointed by Pope Clement VII as Bishop of Urgell. He served as Bishop of Urgell until his death on 26 October 1551. While bishop, he was the principal co-consecrator of Martín Pérez de Ayala, Archbishop of Valencia (1548).

References

External links and additional sources
 (for Chronology of Bishops) 
 (for Chronology of Bishops) 

1551 deaths
16th-century Roman Catholic bishops in Sicily
Bishops appointed by Pope Leo X
Bishops appointed by Pope Clement VII
16th-century Roman Catholic bishops in Spain